Ndande Arrondissement is an arrondissement of the Kébémer Department in the Louga Region of Senegal.

Subdivisions 
The arrondissement is divided administratively into rural communities and in turn into villages.

Arrondissements of Senegal
Louga Region